Robert Harris Kaminsky (born September 2, 1994) is an American professional baseball pitcher who is a free agent. He has played in Major League Baseball (MLB) for the St. Louis Cardinals.

In high school, Kaminsky was the Gatorade New Jersey Baseball Player of the Year in both 2012 and 2013, named to the 2012 USA Today All-USA Team, and a 2013 Baseball America Preseason First Team All-American. In his senior year in 2013 he was 10-0 with a 0.10 ERA, averaging two strikeouts per inning while batting .506. He was drafted by the St. Louis Cardinals at the age of 18 in the first round of the 2013 Major League Baseball Draft, 28th overall.

In 2013, Baseball America ranked him the Gulf Coast League's No. 8 prospect. In 2014, Kaminsky's 1.88 ERA was the best in the Midwest League of all pitchers with 100 or more innings pitched, and he was a Baseball America Low Class A All Star. In 2015, his 2.09 ERA was 2nd-best in the Florida State League of all pitchers with 90 or more innings pitched. In 2016, his 3.28 ERA was 4th-best in the Eastern League. He made his major league debut for the Cardinals in August 2020. Kaminsky will pitch for Team Israel in the 2023 World Baseball Classic in Miami, in March 2023.

Early life
Kaminsky was born in and grew up in Englewood Cliffs, New Jersey. His parents are Donna Kaminsky, and Alan Kaminsky, a civil litigator for Lewis Brisbois Bisgaard & Smith in New York City. He has two older siblings, Joseph and Anna, and his grandfather is Bernard Kaminsky. Kaminsky is Jewish, and his bar mitzvah was based on a baseball theme. His boyhood hero was left-handed pitcher Sandy Koufax, and he said Koufax "stood up for what he believed in" when Koufax decided not to pitch Game 1 of the 1965 World Series because it was on Yom Kippur.

He is nearly completely ambidextrous; Kaminsky writes, throws a football, and shoots a basketball right-handed, but throws a baseball left-handed. In Little League, he sometimes threw left-handed and sometimes threw right-handed. He learned how to switch-hit when he was around 10 years old.

Kaminsky attended Solomon Schechter Day School of Bergen County, a Jewish day school, through eighth grade.<ref>Berger, Eric. "Cardinals’ Jewish left-hander Kaminsky hopes for a playoff role", St. Louis Jewish Light"], August 27, 2020, updated February 11, 2021. Accessed March 8, 2021. "[Q] Tell me a little about where you’re from and your Jewish upbringing. [A] I grew up in Englewood Cliffs, N.J., and live in Englewood now. I moved a nice, five-minute drive from the parents, so that’s nice. I went to Solomon Schechter [Day School of Bergen County] pre-K through eighth grade and had a great, great time there."</ref>

 High school 
Kaminsky attended Saint Joseph Regional High School in Montvale, New Jersey, graduating in 2013. Initially, he was a center fielder, and in 2011 he preferred playing the outfield. He was the Gatorade New Jersey Baseball Player of the Year, and the Star-Ledger New Jersey Player of the Year, in both 2012 and 2013.James Kratch (June 23, 2013). "Robert Kaminsky of St. Joseph (Mont.) is The Star-Ledger's baseball state Player of the Year for 2013," NJ.com. In his junior year in 2012 he was 8-2 with a 0.20 earned run average (ERA), struck out 103 batters and walked 20 in 53 innings, and pitched three no-hitters and three one-hitters. He was also named to the USA Today All-USA Team.

In his senior year in 2013 Kaminsky was 10-0 with a 0.10 ERA, averaged two strikeouts per inning, gave up 14 walks as he struck out 126 in 64 innings, pitched three no-hitters and three one-hitters, while batting .506 with 3 home runs and 19 RBIs.Bob Behre (July 27, 2016). "Six Diamond Nation Players Among State's Top 25," Flemington/Raritan NJ News."Robert Kaminsky - Player Profile," Perfect Game USA.  He was also a Baseball America Preseason First Team All-American and a Rawlings-Perfect Game First Team All-American. Seattle Mariners scout Frank Rendini said: "He has a major-league curveball right now.""New Jersey Baseball POY: Robert Kaminsky," USA Today, May 28, 2013.

While in high school, Kaminsky raised over $30,000 through his Strikeout Challenge charity for the pediatric cancer ward at Englewood Hospital, as he asked supporters to donate whatever amount they chose for each strikeout he recorded in his senior year.Bryan Horowitz (January 27, 2014). "Chasing lofty goals, Cardinals phenom Rob Kaminsky up to the task; Cardinals 2013 Draft pick eager to make splash in first spring camp," mlb.com.

Career
St. Louis Cardinals
Kaminsky was drafted by the St. Louis Cardinals at the age of 18 in the first round of the 2013 Major League Baseball Draft, 28th overall, after Baseball America ranked him the # 21 prospect in the draft.Scott Barancik (June 7, 2013). "Cardinals pick Jewish high-school pitcher in first round," Jewish Baseball News. He became the 12th New Jersey player drafted in the first round directly out of high school since the initial Major League Baseball draft in 1965. He signed for a signing bonus of $1.785 million, foregoing his scholarship to pitch and play center field for the University of North Carolina Tar Heels.

In 2013 he made his professional debut for the Gulf Coast Cardinals in the Rookie Gulf Coast League. Kaminsky appeared in eight games with five starts and had a 3.68 ERA and 28 strikeouts in 22 innings pitched. Baseball America ranked him the Gulf Coast League's No. 8 prospect in 2013.

Kaminsky pitched in 2014 for the Peoria Chiefs of the Class A Midwest League, where he was three years younger than the average player.Daniel Makarewicz (June 1, 2014).  In 2014, he appeared in 18 games, all starts, going 8-2 (his 8 wins were 8th among Cardinals minor leaguers) with a 1.88 ERA (the best ERA in the league of all pitchers with 100 or more innings pitched), a 1.013 WHIP (9th among Cardinals minor leaguers), and a .194/.266/.251 batting-average-against and slash line against."Midwest League (LoA) 2014," Baseball America. He was named a Baseball America Low Class A All Star, and Scout named him the best left-handed starter in the Cardinals' minor league system.Sam Dykstra (July 30, 2015). "Indians acquire Kaminsky in Moss deal; Cardinals send No. 3 prospect to Cleveland in exchange for outfielder," MiLB.com. Peoria pitching coach, and former major leaguer, Jason Simontacchi said: "there’s no question he’s got stuff that could play in the big leagues."

Cleveland Indians
On July 30, 2015, the Cardinals traded Kaminsky to the Cleveland Indians for All Star outfielder/first baseman Brandon Moss. At the time, MLB.com ranked Kaminsky the No. 3 prospect in the St. Louis organization, and 88th overall, and Scout ranked him the best pitcher in the Cardinals' minor league system. Kaminsky finished 2015 with a 6-6 record and a 2.24 ERA. He split it between the Palm Beach Cardinals of the Class A+ Florida State League (where his 2.09 ERA was 2nd-best in the league, of all pitchers with 90 or more innings pitched, he kept opponents to a .228 batting-average-against, and he was one of only two pitchers—from among 393 pitchers—in the minor leagues who did not give up a home run in 90 or more innings) and the Lynchburg Hillcats of the Class A+ Carolina League.Jim Callis (July 30, 2015). "Rob Kaminsky deal a strong trade for Indians; Cleveland gets touted left-handed prospect in exchange for power bat," mlb.com. He was ranked the No. 3 prospect, and top pitching prospect, in the Cleveland Indians organization.Jason Phillips (October 14, 2015). "Rob Kaminsky's strong season validates his role as the Cleveland Indians top pitching prospect," SB Nation.

Kaminsky spent the 2016 season with the Akron RubberDucks of the Double-A Eastern League, where he posted an 11-7 record (his 11 wins were tied for 3rd-best in the league) and a 3.28 ERA (4th in the league). He was 2nd in the league in fewest-hits-per-9-innings (8.01), tied for 3rd in wins, and 4th in ground ball/fly ball ratio (1.70)."Eastern League (AA); 2016," Baseball America. He was one of the youngest players on the team, at 21 years old, and about 3.5 years younger than the average player in the Eastern League.

Kaminsky's three main pitches as of 2016 were an 89-91 mph fastball with some movement that can reach 95 mph, a sharp-breaking upper-70s curveball, and a changeup. In his minor league career, he has induced a high level of ground ball outs, and a low batting-average-against.

In 2017 with Akron, he was placed on the disabled list with left forearm soreness after one start, and did not pitch during the remainder of the season. In August 2017 Kaminsky wrote an article entitled "Life in the minors, working toward a dream; An inside look at the life and grind of the competitive minor leagues, as told by Indians pitching prospect Rob Kaminsky."

In 2018 Kaminsky pitched two scoreless innings for Lynchburg, and then pitched 26.1 innings over 23 games out of the bullpen for Akron, going 1-1 with 4 saves and a 3.28 ERA and holding batters to a 69% ground ball rate.Mike Rosenbaum (October 26, 2018). "Indians Chu takes on AFL after Triple-A stop," MLB.com. Kaminsky then pitched for the Glendale Desert Dogs in the Arizona Fall League, was picked for the league's Fall Stars Game, and in 10 relief appearances during the season was 3-0 with a 1.64 ERA.Wayne Cavadi (November 3, 2018). "Blue Jays: Vladimir Guerrero, Jr. tops Fall Stars Game starting lineups," Minor League Ball.

In 2019 he pitched for both Akron, for whom he was 2-1 with one save in 19 relief appearances with a 2.30 ERA in 31.1 innings, and for the Columbus Clippers of the Class AAA International League, for whom Kaminsky was 1-0 with one save in 23 relief appearances with a 5.11 ERA in 24.2 innings in which he struck out 31 batters and induced a 59.1% ground ball rate.

Kaminsky elected minor league free agency on November 4, 2019. The day he became a minor league free agent, the Cardinals made him an offer.

Second stint with Cardinals
On December 12, 2019, Kaminsky signed a minor league deal with the St. Louis Cardinals, and was invited to major league spring training as a non-roster player. In July 2020 he was added to the Cardinals' 60-player roster pool.

On August 15, 2020, Kaminsky was promoted to the major leagues for the first time.  He made his major league debut for the Cardinals on August 16. Kaminsky was designated for assignment by the Cardinals on September 16; he cleared waivers, remained in the organization, and was outrighted by the Cardinals to their alternate site.
 	
In the pandemic-shortened 2020 season, Kaminsky was 0-0 with a 1.93 ERA in 5 games in which he pitched 4.2 innings. Kaminsky induced a 60% groundball rate. On September 16, 2020, Kaminsky was designated for assignment by the Cardinals. He was outrighted to the alternate training site on September 18 and became a free agent on November 2. Sportswriter Derrick Goold of the St. Louis Post-Dispatch'' said: "This has perplexed some of us around the team... He pitched well for them, was a good depth fit."

Philadelphia Phillies
On April 18, 2021, Kaminsky signed a minor league contract with the Philadelphia Phillies organization. In his lone appearance for the Triple-A Lehigh Valley IronPigs, Kaminsky struck out 2 over one scoreless inning. On August 5, 2021, Kaminsky was released by the Phillies.

Seattle Mariners
On April 6, 2022, Kaminsky signed a minor league contract with the Seattle Mariners organization. Pitching for the Class AA Arkansas Travelers in 2022, he was 3-1 with one save and a 4.91 ERA, as in 39 relief appearances covering 36.2 innings he struck out 39 batters. He elected free agency on November 10, 2022.

Team Israel; World Baseball Classic
Kaminsky will play for Team Israel in the 2023 World Baseball Classic in Miami, starting March 11–15, 2023. He will be playing for Team Israel manager and former All-Star Ian Kinsler, and alongside All-Star outfielder Joc Pederson and pitcher Dean Kremer, among others.

See also
List of Jewish baseball players

References

External links

Rob Kaminsky (August 21, 2017). "Life in the minors; working towards a dream; An inside look at the life and grind of the competitive minor leagues, as told by Indians pitching prospect Rob Kaminsky," Let's Go Tribe

1994 births
Living people
Akron RubberDucks players
Arkansas Travelers players
Baseball players from New Jersey
Columbus Clippers players
Glendale Desert Dogs players
Gulf Coast Cardinals players
Jewish American baseball players
Jewish Major League Baseball players
Lehigh Valley IronPigs players
Lynchburg Hillcats players
Major League Baseball pitchers
Palm Beach Cardinals players
People from Englewood Cliffs, New Jersey
Peoria Chiefs players
Saint Joseph Regional High School alumni
Sportspeople from Bergen County, New Jersey
St. Louis Cardinals players
21st-century American Jews